Ahmad Aminuddin Shaharudin (born 21 March 1990 in Selangor) is a Malaysian  footballer currently playing for DRB-Hicom F.C. in the 2014 Malaysia FAM League.

He had played for Harimau Muda (with whom he won the 2009 Malaysia Premier League title), Perlis, Negeri Sembilan, Felda United and Sarawak. Aminuddin was included in the Malaysia u19 team and the Malaysia u21 team.

References

External links
 
 Profile at ifball.com

Living people
1990 births
Malaysian footballers
Perlis FA players
Negeri Sembilan FA players
Sarawak FA players
People from Selangor
Melaka United F.C. players
Association football forwards